Wild Case Files is a documentary television series that premiered in the United Kingdom in July 2006 on the National Geographic Channel.

2006 British television series debuts
2006 British television series endings
British documentary television series
National Geographic (American TV channel) original programming
English-language television shows